Tullig can refer to:
 Tullig (County Clare) - small village in County Clare at the Loop Head peninsula
 Tullig (County Kerry) - townland in County Kerry
 Tullig (County Cork) - townland in County Cork